The anterior triangle is a region of the neck.

Structure
The triangle is inverted with its apex inferior to its base which is under the chin.

Investing fascia covers the roof of the triangle while visceral fascia covers the floor.

Anatomy
Muscles:
 Suprahyoid muscles - Digastric (Ant and Post Belly), mylohyoid, geniohyoid and Stylohyoid.
 Infrahyoid muscles - Omohyoid, Sternohyoid, Sternothyroid, and Thyrohyoid.

Nerve supply
2 Bellies of Digastric

 Anterior: Mylohyoid nerve
 Posterior: Facial nerve

Stylohyoid: by the facial nerve, by a branch from that to the posterior belly of digastric.

Mylohyoid: by its own nerve, a branch of the inferior alveolar ( from the mandibular division of trigeminal nerve), which arises just before the parent nerve enters the mandibular foramen, pierces the sphenomandibular ligament, and runs forward on the inferior surface of the mylohyoid, supplying it and the anterior belly of the digastric.

Geniohyoid: by a branch from the hypoglossal nerve consisting of fibres from the C1 nerve.

Sternohyoid, Omohyoid, Sternothyroid are supplied by Ansa cervicalis.

Thyrohyoid: by a branch of hypoglossal nerve but the fibres are all 'hitch-hiking' from C1.

Development
 Anterior: 1st Pharyngeal arch
 Posterior: 2nd Pharyngeal arch

Divisions
This space is subdivided into four smaller triangles by the Digastricus above, and the superior belly of the Omohyoideus.

These smaller triangles are named:
 the muscular triangle
 the carotid triangle
 the submandibular triangle
 the submental triangle

Additional images

See also
 Posterior triangle of the neck

References

External links
 
 

Human head and neck
Triangles of the neck